Interferon regulatory factor 8 (IRF8) also known as interferon consensus sequence-binding protein (ICSBP), is a protein that in humans is encoded by the IRF8 gene. IRF8 is a transcription factor that plays critical roles in the regulation of lineage commitment and in myeloid cell maturation including the decision for a common myeloid progenitor (CMP) to differentiate into a monocyte precursor cell.

Function 
Interferon Consensus Sequence-binding protein (ICSBP) is a transcription factor of the interferon regulatory factor (IRF) family. Proteins of this family are composed of a conserved DNA-binding domain in the N-terminal region and a divergent C-terminal region that serves as the regulatory domain. The IRF family proteins bind to the IFN-stimulated response element (ISRE) and regulate expression of genes stimulated by type I IFNs, namely IFN-α and IFN-β. IRF family proteins also control expression of IFN-α and IFN-β-regulated genes that are induced by viral infection.

Knockout studies 
IFN-producing cells (mIPCs) were absent in all lymphoid organs from ICSBP knockout (KO) mice, as revealed by lack of CD11clowB220+Ly6C+CD11b− cells. In parallel, CD11c+ cells isolated from ICSBP KO spleens were unable to produce type I IFNs in response to viral stimulation. ICSBP KO mice also displayed a marked reduction of the DC subset expressing the CD8alpha marker (CD8alpha+ DCs) in spleen, lymph nodes, and thymus. Moreover, ICSBP-deficient CD8alpha+ DCs exhibited a markedly impaired phenotype when compared with WT DCs. They expressed very low levels of costimulatory molecules (intercellular adhesion molecule ICAM1, CD40, CD80, CD86) and of the T cell area-homing chemokine receptor CCR7.

Clinical significance 
In myeloid cells, IRF8 regulates the expression of Bax and Fas to regulate apoptosis. In chronic myelogenous leukemia (CML), IRF8 regulates acid ceramidase to mediate CML apoptosis.

IRF8 is highly expressed in myeloid cells and was originally identified in as a critical lineage-specific transcription factor for myeloid cell differentiation, recent studies, however, have shown that IRF8 is also constitutively expressed in non-hematopoietic cancer cells, albeit at a lower level. Furthermore, IRF8 can also be up-regulated by IFN-γ in non-hemotopoietic cells. IRF8 mediates the expression of Fas, Bax, FLIP, Jak1 and STAT1 to mediate apoptosis in non-hemotopoietic cancer cells.

Analysis of human cancer genomics database revealed that IRF8 is not significantly focally amplified across the entire dataset of 3131 tumors, but is significantly focally deleted across the entire dataset of 3131 tumors, suggesting that IRF8 is potentially a tumor suppressor in humans. Molecular analysis indicated that the IRF8 gene promoter is hypermethylated in human colon carcinoma cells, suggesting that these cells might use DNA methylation to silence IRF8 expression to advance the disease.

Interactions 

IRF8 has been shown to interact with IRF1 and COPS2.

See also 
 Interferon regulatory factors

References

Illustrations

Further reading

External links 
 

Transcription factors